Jane Marie Genevieve Wiedlin (born May 20, 1958) is an American musician and singer, best known as the co-founder, rhythm guitarist and backing vocalist of the new wave band The Go-Go's. She has also had a successful solo career.

The Go-Go's went on to become one of the most successful American bands of the 1980s, helping popularize new wave music with hits such as "We Got the Beat", "Our Lips Are Sealed", and "Vacation".  As a solo artist, Wiedlin had her biggest hit with the song "Rush Hour", which peaked at number 9 on the Billboard Hot 100.  As an actress, she had roles as the singing telegram girl in Clue (1985) and as Joan of Arc in Bill & Ted's Excellent Adventure (1989).

As a member of The Go-Go's, Wiedlin received a star on the Hollywood Walk of Fame. She and the band were inducted into the Rock and Roll Hall of Fame in 2021.

Early life
Wiedlin was born in Oconomowoc, Wisconsin. Her father, Robert Arthur Wiedlin Sr., an oral surgeon of German and Swiss ancestry, was born in Chicago, Illinois. Her mother, Betty Jane (née Herro), was of Lebanese heritage. Wiedlin's parents met while students at Marquette University. She is one of five children, with a sister and three brothers, and was raised Catholic. During Wiedlin's early childhood, her family lived in West Allis, a suburb of Milwaukee, Wisconsin. When she was six, her father took a job with the United States Department of Veterans Affairs at a VA hospital in Los Angeles, and the family followed.

Wiedlin has said, "I remember my childhood as extremely idyllic." She has also mentioned her adolescence with angst and hope by saying, "I was a depressed teenager. I thought life was completely pointless when I was in high school, but just a few short years later I was having the adventure of a lifetime in a successful rock band!" She attended William Howard Taft High School in Los Angeles from 1972 to 1976.

Career

The Go-Go's
According to Wiedlin, she was present "pretty much from the beginning" of the Los Angeles punk scene. While attending college in the Los Angeles area for fashion design, she worked at a fashion-design house where she created song lyrics by scribbling ideas on clothing patterns. Under the moniker Jane Drano, she would later design punk-style clothing that she sold at Granny Takes a Trip, a store on Sunset Boulevard. She became part of the scene that spawned bands such as X, the Germs and the Weirdos.

Wiedlin and Belinda Carlisle formed the Go-Go's as a punk band in 1978, with Margot Olaverra on bass and Elissa Bello on drums.

In 1981, Wiedlin and Terry Hall of Fun Boy Three and the Specials co-wrote "Our Lips Are Sealed". The song peaked on the Billboard Hot 100 chart at No. 20, where it remained until 1982.

After a series of reunions during the 1990s, Wiedlin, Carlisle, Caffey, Schock and Valentine reunited in 2000 to record God Bless the Go-Go's, their first studio album in 17 years. The album's title and concept came from Wiedlin.

In 2010, the Go-Go's announced their "Happily Ever After" farewell tour. Although scheduled to begin in July, the tour was canceled because of ACL tears that Wiedlin had suffered in both knees after falling during a nighttime hike.

The Go-Go's announced an 11-date reunion tour scheduled to begin in June 2020. However, in May 2020 the tour was postponed due to the COVID-19 pandemic.

In May 2021 it was announced that The Go-Go's would be inducted into the Rock and Roll Hall of Fame on October 30, 2021.
The band confirmed plans for a 2022 UK tour with Billy Idol that would start in June 2022.

Solo career

Wiedlin has released four solo albums: Jane Wiedlin in 1985, Fur in 1988, Tangled in 1990 and Kissproof World in 2000. From 1995 to 1998, she was also a member of the band FroSTed, which released one album, Cold, in 1996. In 2017, Wiedlin teamed up with the American-born Italian multi-instrumentalist and songwriter Pietro Straccia to form a new psychedelic/pop/harmony and guitar-driven duo called Elettrodomestico.

Acting career
Wiedlin's early acting credits include a brief appearance as an officer seen on a Starfleet Command video screen in Star Trek IV: The Voyage Home (1986), an ill-fated singing telegram girl in Clue (1985), the White Fairy in Golan-Globus's Sleeping Beauty (1987) and as Joan of Arc in Bill & Ted's Excellent Adventure (1989). Of her 1980s acting career, she has stated, "It turned out to be much harder than it looks, and as much as I enjoyed those experiences, I don't think I'm very good at it."

In 2001, she had a regular role in MTV's Spyder Games, portraying the "ex-rock chick who runs the local coffee house" where the characters hang out.

In 2005, she appeared as herself on the fourth season of VH1's The Surreal Life, in which she talked about her interest in BDSM.

She portrayed the role of Ursula in Steve Balderson's 2005 surrealist crime drama film Firecracker, which Roger Ebert listed among the year's best films. She worked twice more with director Balderson, in Stuck! (2009), a homage to film noir women in prison dramas.

In 2011, she played Tess in the independent movie I Want to Get Married.

She has also provided voices for characters in television and film animation, such as Bruce Wayne's girlfriend in an episode of The New Batman Adventures, Gwen on Mission Hill, and Dusk of the Hex Girls, a recurring character in the Scooby-Doo franchise.

Other work
In 2000 Wiedlin and fellow Go-Go, Charlotte Caffey, co-wrote Keith Urban's first #1 song, "But for the Grace of God." Wiedlin contributed quotations to Girls Against Girls by author Bonnie Burton. Wiedlin was a contributing writer to the Los Angeles punk rock books Under The Big Black Sun (2016) and More Fun In The New World (2019) by John Doe and Tom DeSavia.
In April 2009, Wiedlin was photographed as Bettie Page by Austin Young for the "Heaven Bound" art show. A number of her songs were to be featured in the 2018 debut of the Broadway musical Head Over Heels, with a story suggested by Philip Sidney's Arcadia set to the songs of the Go-Go's and Belinda Carlisle.

Personal life
A long-time animal rights activist, Wiedlin has worked with PETA since as far back as 1989 when she performed as part of a "Rock Against Fur" concert in New York City and is a friend of PETA executive Dan Mathews.

Wiedlin has discussed her struggles with depression and mental health, and how it affected her at several stages of her life, including a suicide attempt in high school, and the effects fame (and a lack of healthy coping mechanisms) had on her wellbeing.

During Wiedlin's time in the Los Angeles punk scene, her first real boyfriend was Terry Bag (Terry Graham) of the punk band, The Bags and later The Gun Club. She later had what she called a "short but dramatic romance" with Terry Hall of the Specials during a 1980 British tour. Hall later sent her some lyrics prompted by their relationship, inspiring Wiedlin to write "Our Lips Are Sealed", a song on which Hall has co-writer credit. In the 2020 documentary The Go-Go's, bandmate Gina Schock stated that she and Wiedlin were "girlfriends" for a time until Wiedlin broke up with her. Wiedlin also had a brief relationship with Russell Mael of the band Sparks.

Wiedlin identifies as bisexual.

In addition to acting and singing, Wiedlin is an ordained minister of the Universal Life Church, a mail-order religious organization that offers anyone semi-immediate, no-cost ordination as a ULC minister. Wiedlin identifies herself as "Reverend Sister Go-Go",  primarily officiating at weddings.

Wiedlin was married to Ged Malone from 1987 to 1999.

She was married to David Trotter from 2004 to 2005.

Wiedlin got engaged to her boyfriend Terence Lundy in October 2022. They were married in February 2023.

Discography

Studio albums

Compilation albums

Singles

Featured singles

Other releases

 1990 Pretty Woman soundtrack (EMI, re-released 2006, with bonus disc) – "Tangled"
 1996 Cold (Geffen Records) – As froSTed
 2001 Josie and the Pussycats Original Soundtrack – Contributor on "You Don't See" and "Come On". 
 2002 The Specials vs. the Untouchables: Ska's Greatest Stars (Big Eye Music) – Rearrangement of "Our Lips Are Sealed" with the Specials
 2006 80's New Wave Hits (Big Eye Music) – Rearrangement of "Our Lips Are Sealed" with The Specials
 2017 Elettrodomestico (If You're a Boy or a Girl)

References

External links

 
 
 
 
  
 
 

1958 births
20th-century American guitarists
20th-century American singers
20th-century American women guitarists
20th-century American women singers
21st-century American singers
21st-century American women singers
American atheists
American new wave musicians
American people of Lebanese descent
American people of Swiss descent
American rock guitarists
American sopranos
American voice actresses
American women rock singers
Bisexual singers
Bisexual women
EMI Records artists
The Go-Go's members
Bisexual songwriters
Guitarists from Wisconsin
I.R.S. Records artists
LGBT people from Wisconsin
American LGBT songwriters
Living people
People from Oconomowoc, Wisconsin
People from West Allis, Wisconsin
Rhythm guitarists
Singers from Wisconsin
William Howard Taft Charter High School alumni
Women new wave singers
American LGBT singers
Women in punk
American bisexual writers